In drilling technology, casing string is a long section of connected oilfield pipe that is lowered into a wellbore and cemented. The purpose of the casing pipe is as follows:

 prevent the collapse of the borehole
 prevent formation fluids from entering the borehole in an uncontrolled way (blow out)
 prevent fluids in the borehole ( such as produced oil or gas, drilling mud etc.) from entering other formations

Background
(Some specialty casing is manufactured in one piece with a female thread machined directly into one end.)

This and related API documents also promulgate standards for the threaded end finish, the wall thickness (several are available in each size to satisfy various design parameters, and in fact are indirectly specified by standardized nominal weights per linear foot; thicker pipe obviously being heavier), and the strength and certain chemical characteristics of the steel material. Finally, the API publications provide performance minimums for longitudinal strength ("joint strength") as well as resistance to internal (bursting) and external (collapsing) pressure differentials.

A typical piece of casing might be described as 9-5/8" 53.5# P-110 LT&C Rg 3: specifying OD, weight per foot (53.5 lbm/ft thus 0.545-inch wall thickness and 8.535-inch inside diameter), steel strength (110,000 psi yield strength), end finish ("Long Threaded and Coupled"), and approximate length ("Range 3" usually runs between 40 and 42 feet).

Casing is run to protect or isolate formations adjacent to the wellbore. It is generally not possible to drill a well through all of the formations from surface (or the seabed) to the target depth in one hole-size section. For example, fresh-water-bearing zones (usually found only near the surface) must be protected soon after being penetrated. The well is therefore drilled in sections, with each section of the well being sealed off by lining the inside of the borehole with steel pipe, known as casing, and filling the annular space (or at least the lower portion) between this casing string and the borehole wall with cement. Then drilling commences on the subsequent hole section, necessarily with a smaller bit diameter that will pass through the newly installed casing.

Other than the obvious cost savings, the liner installation allows larger drill pipe or production tubing to be used in the upper portions of the well. (A disadvantage is the occasional difficulty in effecting a pressure seal by squeeze cementing the casing-liner overlap zone.)

Depending on the conditions encountered (e.g., zones of differing formation pressure gradients), three or four casing strings may be required to reach the target depth. The cost of the casing can constitute 20-30% of the total cost of the well, and failure can be catastrophic. Great care must therefore be taken when designing an economic casing programme that will meet the requirements of the well.

References

Drilling technology